Self-titled means named with an eponym: a person, a place, or a thing, after whom or which someone or something is named.

Self-titled may also refer to:

 Self-Titled (Marcus Mumford album), 2022
 Self-Titled (Zao album), 2001
 Self-titled Album (The Audition album), 2009
 Self-titled Album (The Huntingtons album), 2002
 Self-Titled Long-Playing Debut Album, by +/-, 2002
 Self Titled or Scoop Du Jour, an album by Whirlwind Heat, 2008
 The Self-Titled Album, by Tenement, 2016
 S/T (Electric President album), 2006
 S/T (Rainer Maria album), 2017
 Self-Titled, previous band of Fearless Vampire Killers members
 "Self Titled", a song by Reks from the 2011 album Rhythmatic Eternal King Supreme
 Blink-182 (album), 2003, often known as "Self-Titled"

See also 

Nameless (disambiguation)
Untitled (disambiguation)
Self-styled